Notts, Lincs & Derbyshire/Leicestershire 2 West was a tier 10 English Rugby Union league with teams from Derbyshire, Nottinghamshire and the western region of Leicestershire taking part.  Promoted teams moved up to Notts, Lincs & Derbyshire/Leicestershire 1 West and there was no relegation.

The division was created in 2000, along with its counterpart Notts, Lincs & Derbyshire/Leicestershire 2 East, following the splitting of the East Midlands and Leicestershire leagues and the subsequent merging of the Leicestershire and Notts, Lincs & Derbyshire leagues.  After four seasons the league was discontinued following further restructuring and teams moved into the newly created Notts, Lincs, Derbyshire/North Leicestershire, Derbyshire/North Leicestershire and East Midlands/South Leicestershire 2 divisions.

Original teams

When this division was introduced in 2000 it contained the following teams:

Ashby – transferred from East Midlands 2 (8th)
Aylestonians – transferred from East Midlands 2 (5th)
Chesterfield Panthers (2nd XV) – transferred from Notts, Lincs & Derbyshire 2 (15th)
Hope Valley – transferred from Notts, Lincs & Derbyshire 2 (13th)
Meden Vale – transferred from Notts, Lincs & Derbyshire 2 (14th) 
Ollerton – promoted from Notts, Lincs & Derbyshire 3 (runners up)
University of Derby – promoted from Notts, Lincs & Derbyshire 3 (champions)

Notts, Lincs & Derbyshire/Leicestershire 2 West honours

Number of league titles

Aylestonians (1)
Castle Donington (1)
Chesterfield Panthers (1)
Leesbrook (1)

Notes

See also
Notts, Lincs & Derbyshire/Leicestershire 1 East
Notts, Lincs & Derbyshire/Leicestershire 1 West
Notts, Lincs & Derbyshire/Leicestershire 2 East
Midlands RFU
Notts, Lincs & Derbyshire RFU
Leicestershire RU
English rugby union system
Rugby union in England

References

External links
 NLD RFU website
 Leicestershire Rugby Union website

Defunct rugby union leagues in England
Rugby union in Derbyshire
Rugby union in Nottinghamshire
Rugby union in Leicestershire
Sports leagues established in 2000
Sports leagues disestablished in 2004